Billboard Top R&B Records of 1952 is made up of two year-end charts compiled by Billboard magazine ranking the year's top rhythm and blues records based on record sales and juke box plays.

See also
Billboard No. 1 R&B singles of 1952
Billboard year-end top 30 singles of 1952
1952 in music

References

1952 record charts
Billboard charts
1952 in American music